Aleiodes indiscretus is a species of parasitoid wasp.

References

Braconidae
Insects described in 1970